Yanagimoto is a Japanese surname. Notable people with the surname include:

, Japanese footballer
, Imperial Japanese Navy admiral
, Japanese volleyball player
, Japanese politician

See also
Yanagimoto Domain, a Japanese domain of the Edo period
Yanagimoto Station, a railway station in Tenri, Nara Prefecture, Japan

Japanese-language surnames